The Fafai Beach Site is a prehistoric archaeological site near the village of Tamuning on the island of Guam.  The site is stratified, containing layers representative of both the Latte and Pre-Latte periods of prehistory.  The site includes several latte stone house sites, stone mortar sites, and rock overhang areas with cultural deposits.  Stone, shell, and charcoal artifacts have been found here, as have several human burials.

The site was listed on the National Register of Historic Places in 1974.

See also
National Register of Historic Places listings in Guam

References

Archaeological sites on the National Register of Historic Places in Guam
Tumon, Guam
Beaches of Guam